Martin Noth (3 August 1902 – 30 May 1968) was a German scholar of the Hebrew Bible who specialized in the pre-Exilic history of the Hebrews and promoted the hypothesis that the Israelite tribes in the immediate period after the settlement in Canaan were organised as a group of twelve tribes  arranged around a central sanctuary on the lines of the later Greek and Italian amphictyonies. With Gerhard von Rad he pioneered the traditional-historical approach to biblical studies, emphasising the role of oral traditions in the formation of the biblical texts.

Life

Noth was born in Dresden, Kingdom of Saxony. He studied at the universities of Erlangen, Rostock, and Leipzig and taught at Greifswald and Königsberg.

From 1939-41 and 1943–45, Noth served as a German soldier during World War II. After the war he taught at Bonn, Göttingen, Tübingen, Hamburg, and University of Basel. He died during an expedition in the Negev, Israel.

Influence
Noth first attracted widespread attention with "Das System der zwölf Stämme Israels" (“The Scheme of the Twelve Tribes of Israel”, 1930), positing that the Twelve Tribes of Israel did not exist prior to the covenant assembly at Shechem described in the Book of Joshua.

"A History of Pentateuchal Traditions", (1948, English translation 1972) set out a new model for the composition of the  Pentateuch, or Torah. Noth supplemented the dominant model of the time, the documentary hypothesis, seeing the Pentateuch as composed of blocks of traditional material accreted round some key historical experiences. He identified these experiences as "Guidance out of Egypt", "Guidance into the Arable Land", "Promise to the Patriarchs", "Guidance in the Wilderness" and "Revelation at Sinai", the details of the narrative serving to fill out the thematic outline. Later, Robert Polzin showed that some of his main conclusions were consistent with arbitrary or inconsistent use of the rules that he proposed.

Even more revolutionary and influential, and quite reorienting the emphasis of modern scholarship, was The Deuteronomistic History. In this work, Noth argued that the earlier theory of several Deuteronomist redactions of the books from Joshua to Kings did not explain the facts, and instead proposed that they formed a unified "Deuteronomic history", the product of a single author working in the late 7th century.

Noth also published commentaries on all the five books of the Pentateuch: Genesis, Exodus, Leviticus, Numbers, and Deuteronomy. Noth considered that the book of Deuteronomy was more closely related to the following books of Joshua, Judges, Samuel, and Kings (The Deuteronomistic History). This theory is widely accepted today, and provides the framework for current research on the historical books of the Old Testament.

Works

Books
 
  - translation of Geschichte Israels
  - translation of Das Zzweite Buch Mose : Exodus
  - translation of Das Dritte Buch Mose: Leviticus
  - translation of Das Vierte Buch Mose : Numeri
 
  - translation of Überlieferungsgeschichtliche Studien

Articles

See also
 Ancient Israel and Judah
 Books of Chronicles
 Deuteronomistic History
 Ezra–Nehemiah
 Kingdom of Judah

References

External links
 
Review of Noth's A History of Pentateuchal Traditions, Robert Polzin, Bulletin of the American Schools of Oriental Research, No. 221, (Feb., 1976), pp. 113–120

Bruce C Birch, Methodology in writing Israel's early history: Martin Noth and John Bright
Steven L. McKenzie, The History of Israel's Traditions: The Heritage of Martin Noth (JSOT Supplement)(1996) 
C. H. de Geus, The Tribes of Israel: An Investigation into Some of the Presuppositions of Martin Noth's Amphictyony Hypothesis (Studia Semitica Neerlandica) (1976) 
Steven L. McKenzie, review of Martin Noth—aus der Sicht der heutigen Forschung (Udo Rüterswörden (ed.), 2004)

1902 births
1968 deaths
German biblical scholars
Old Testament scholars
Documentary hypothesis
German Lutheran theologians
20th-century German Protestant theologians
German military personnel of World War II
Writers from Dresden
People from the Kingdom of Saxony
University of Erlangen-Nuremberg alumni
University of Rostock alumni
Leipzig University alumni
Academic staff of the University of Greifswald
Academic staff of the University of Königsberg
Academic staff of the University of Bonn
Academic staff of the University of Göttingen
Academic staff of the University of Tübingen
Academic staff of the University of Hamburg
20th-century German writers
German male non-fiction writers
Lutheran biblical scholars
20th-century Lutherans